John Aloysius Morgan,  (9 October 1909 – 21 May 2008) was an Australian prelate of the Roman Catholic Church.

Early life

Morgan was born in Keilor on the outskirts of Melbourne, Victoria, where his father Patrick owned and operated a farm. He attended St Columbas Primary School in Essendon before moving on to St Joseph's Christian Brothers College in North Melbourne in 1917 and again from 1920 to 1926, finally completing his secondary schooling at St. Kevins. He and his brother Frank traveled to school each day by horse and buggy. While at school he was considered a very good high jumper and champion handball player and retained a love of sport, and in particular, Australian rules football, throughout his life.

Religious life

He was ordained a priest on 15 July 1934 for the Archdiocese of Melbourne.  During the Second World War he served as a Chaplain with the Second Australian Imperial Force in Papua New Guinea from 1942 to 1945. He later recalled that his experiences there were a formative part of his spiritual and personal life. He remained an Army Chaplain until 1981 when he stepped down as the Army's Chaplain General. While in Melbourne he was placed in charge of various parishes including, in 1953, St James' parish in Richmond.

Morgan was appointed auxiliary bishop of the Archdiocese of Canberra and Goulburn as well as Titular Bishop of Membressa on 6 March 1969.  He was ordained bishop on 28 April 1969.  He was appointed on 29 May 1969 to the Roman Catholic Military Ordinariate of Australia where he would remain until of 2 January 1985, as well as the auxiliary bishop of the Canberra and Goulburn archdiocese.

Later life

In 2003 he concelebrated Mass at St Patrick's Cathedral Melbourne to mark the centenary of his old school, St Joseph's CBC North Melbourne. As he had done with the soldiers in New Guinea, he retained strong pastoral feelings for his flock, the residents in the center where he lived, celebrating Mass daily and speaking with them whenever possible.
 
Morgan held the following honours: Officer of the Order of Australia (1976), Reserve Force Decoration and the Efficiency Decoration. He died on 21 May 2008 aged 98.

See also
Archdiocese of Canberra and Goulburn
Archdiocese of Melbourne
Roman Catholic Military Ordinariate of Australia

References

External links
Catholic Hierarchy website listing
Military diocese website

1909 births
2008 deaths
20th-century Roman Catholic bishops in Australia
Australian Army chaplains
Australian military chaplains
Australian military personnel of World War II
Officers of the Order of Australia
Roman Catholic bishops of the Catholic Military Ordinariate of Australia
Military personnel from Melbourne
People educated at St Joseph's College, Melbourne
People educated at St Kevin's College, Melbourne
People from Keilor, Victoria